The 1981–82 Football League Cup (known as the Milk Cup for sponsorship reasons) was the 22nd season of the Football League Cup, a knockout competition for England's top 92 football clubs. The competition started on 31 August 1981 and ended with the final on 13 March 1982.

The final was contested by First Division teams Tottenham Hotspur and Liverpool at Wembley Stadium in London.

First round

First Leg

Second Leg

Second round

First Leg

Second Leg

Third round

Ties

Replays

2nd Replay

Fourth round

Ties

Replay

Fifth Round

Ties

Replay

Semi-finals
Holders Liverpool defeated Ipswich Town – who were also competing with them for the league title – over the two legs to reach the final. Fellow title contenders Tottenham Hotspur won the other semi-final against relegation threatened West Bromwich Albion.

First Leg

Second Leg

Final

References

General

Specific

EFL Cup seasons
1981–82 domestic association football cups
Lea
Cup